Funky-Do! is the second album by The Crown Royals, an instrumental R&B/funk quartet which includes jazz saxophonist Ken Vandermark. It was recorded in 1998 and released on Estrus.

Reception
The CMJ New Music Report review by Tad Hendrickson states "Like Booker T. & the M.G.'s, these cats pump out endless grooves, paying unflagging attention to the nuances and rhythmic intricacies of the genre."

Track listing
All compositions by The Crown Royals except as indicated
 "Big Bag" – 5:08
 "Old Skin" – 2:59
 "Sassin' Back" – 4:08
 "Ding Dong" (H. Alexander) – 3:06
 "Liquid Wrench" – 5:22
 "Rip 'N' Run" – 3:06
 "Thug" – 5:00
 "The Cyclone" – 2:15
 "S.J. Especial" – 4:24
 "My Baby Likes To Boogaloo" (D. Gardner) – 3:51

Personnel
Jeff BBQ – drums
Mark Blade – bass
Pete Nathan – guitar
Ken Vandermark – tenor sax

References

1999 albums
Ken Vandermark albums